The Minister for Sport and Recreation in New Zealand is the cabinet member appointed by the Prime Minister to be in charge of the Sport New Zealand. The current Minister for Sport and Recreation is Grant Robertson.

List of ministers
The following ministers have held the office of Minister for Sport and Recreation.

Key

Notes

References

Trade
Political office-holders in New Zealand